is a Japanese politician serving in the House of Representatives in the Diet (national legislature) as a member of the Democratic Party of Japan. A native of Shizuoka, Shizuoka and graduate of the University of Tokyo, he worked at the Ministry of Finance from 1991 to 2002 and attended the Ford School at the University of Michigan in 1993. He was elected for the first time in 2004 after an unsuccessful run in 2003. He is an assenter of the movie The Truth about Nanjing.

References

External links
 Official website

Living people
1968 births
People from Shizuoka (city)
Democratic Party of Japan politicians
Members of the House of Representatives (Japan)
Nanjing Massacre deniers
Gerald R. Ford School of Public Policy alumni
21st-century Japanese politicians